The Georgian diaspora refers to both historical and present emigration from Georgia. The countries with the largest Georgian communities outside Georgia are Turkey and Russia.

Geographic distribution

Notable people of Georgian descent

 André Andersen, a Russia-born Danish multi-instrumentalist and composer.
David Bagration of Mukhrani, a claimant to the headship of the Royal House of Georgia and to the historical thrones of Georgia.
 Jorge de Bagration, a Spanish racing car driver of Georgian descent and a claimant to the headship of the Royal House of Georgia and to the historical throne of Georgia.
 George Balanchine, one of the 20th century's most famous choreographers.
 Paata Tsikurishvili, Founding Artistic Director & CEO of highly  acclaimed Synetic Theater in Washington DC metropolitan USA 2001–present. synetictheater.org
Irina Tsikurishvili, Founding Choreographer of Synetic Theater. Most celebrated choreographer in DMV region. 
 David Baramidze, a Georgian-born German chess Grandmaster.
Elena Botchorichvili, a writer
 David Chavchavadze, an American author and a former Central Intelligence Agency (CIA) officer of Georgian-Russian origin.
 Maryam d'Abo, an English film and television actress.
 Lasha Darbaidze, a Georgian-born American citizen who holds the positions of Honorary Consul of Georgia and President of the St. George Foundation.
 Anna Dogonadze, a Georgian-born German athlete.
 Vernon Duke, an American composer and songwriter.
 Wachtang Djobadze, a Georgian art historian who lived in the United States as an émigré.
 Andrew Eristoff, a Republican Party politician from New York City who serves as New Jersey State Treasurer under Governor Chris Christie.
 Georgiy Gongadze, a Ukrainian journalist of Georgian origin who was kidnapped and murdered in 2000.
 Alex Greenwich, the member of the New South Wales Legislative Assembly seat of Sydney.
 Michael Gregor, an aircraft engineer of Georgian origin.
 Elly Heuss-Knapp, a German liberal politician and author.
 Tzipi Hotovely, an Israeli politician and member of the Knesset for the Likud party.
 Darren Huckerby, an English former professional footballer and academy coach.
 Alexander Kartveli, an influential aircraft engineer and a pioneer of American aviation history.
 María Katzarava, Mexican opera soprano of Georgian descent.
 David Koma, a Georgian born London based fashion designer.
 Vitaliy Kononov, a candidate in the 2004 Ukrainian presidential election, nominated by the Green Party of Ukraine.
 Kola Kwariani, a Georgian-American professional wrestler and chess player.
 Giorgi Latso, a Georgian-American classical pianist and composer.
 Georges V. Matchabelli, a Georgian nobleman and diplomat, who emigrated to the United States after the 1921 Soviet invasion of Georgia.
 Katie Melua, a Georgian-born British singer, songwriter and musician.
 George Papashvily, a Georgian-American writer and sculptor.
 Irina Shabayeva, the winner of the sixth season of Project Runway along with her model, Kalyn Hemphill.
 John Shalikashvili, a United States Army General who served as Chairman of the Joint Chiefs of Staff and Supreme Allied Commander from 1993 to 1997.
 Joseph Stalin (born Ioseb Besarionis dzе Jughashvili), the de facto leader of the Soviet Union from the mid-1920s until his death in 1953.
 Tamta, a Greek pop singer famous in Greece and Cyprus.
 Omari Tetradze, a former football player of Georgian Greek descent who, during his playing career, represented Russia at international level.
 Jerzy Tumaniszwili, a Polish naval commander of a Georgian aristocratic descent.

Destinations

Europe 
 Georgians in Austria
 Georgians in Belarus
 Georgians in Belgium 
 Georgians in Bulgaria 
 Georgians in Croatia 
 Georgians in Cyprus 
 Georgians in Denmark 
 Georgians in Estonia 
 Georgians in Finland
 Georgians in France
 Georgians in Germany
 Georgians in Greece 
 Georgians in Latvia 
 Georgians in Lithuania
 Georgians in the Netherlands
 Georgian emigration in Poland 
 Georgians in Romania
 Georgians in Russia
 Georgians in Spain 
 Georgians in Sweden
 Georgians in Ukraine
 The World Congress of the Nations of Georgia

North America
 Georgians in Canada
 Georgian Americans

Asia
 Georgians in Iran 
 Georgians in Kazakhstan
 Georgians in Turkey

See also 
 List of Georgians
 History of Georgia

References
Notes

Citations

 
European diasporas